Christopher Robinson (1712-1787) was an Irish barrister and judge, who for many years was the senior ordinary judge of the Irish courts of common law. He is best remembered for giving the adventurer Francis Higgins the nickname "The Sham Squire", and for his impressive collection of legal textbooks, which forms the basis of the Library of the King's Inns.

Early career 

He was born in Dublin, eldest son of Bryan Robinson (1689-1754), Regius Professor of Physic at the University of Dublin and President of the Royal College of Physicians of Ireland, and his wife Mary. The Robinson family came originally from Clapham, North Yorkshire. He had two brothers, one of whom, Robert, became a doctor, and like his father was elected President of the Royal College of Physicians of Ireland. Christopher was tutored at home, and matriculated from the University of Dublin in 1729. He entered Lincoln's Inn in 1732, was called to the Bar in 1737, and took silk in 1745. He acted on occasion as an extra judge of assize. Though a man of strong opinions he seems to have had no interest in politics as such, and never sat in the Irish Parliament.

Judge 
He was appointed a judge of the Court of King's Bench (Ireland) in 1758 and served on the Court until his death almost thirty years later. His appointment was said to be a reward for writing pamphlets supporting the Government.

His most celebrated trial was that of the notorious confidence trickster Francis Higgins ("the Sham Squire") in 1767 for a serious assault on his mother-in-law, Mrs. Archer. It was Robinson at the trial who first used the sobriquet "Sham Squire", which stuck. Higgins served a prison sentence for the assault, but this was only a brief check to his remarkable career, which saw him becoming an attorney, a justice of the peace and an informer for the Dublin Castle administration.

Robinson was also seneschal of St. Patrick's Cathedral, Dublin.

Family 

He married Elizabeth Martin, daughter of the Reverend Hartstonge Martin of Cashel, County Tipperary and his wife Susan Wemyss, in 1758, and had one surviving son, also named Christopher, who became a clergyman, and served as rector of Granard, County Longford. The younger Christopher married Elizabeth Langrishe, daughter of the leading politician Sir Hercules Langrishe, 1st Baronet and his wife Hannah Myhill, and had several children, including Hercules, an Admiral, who was the father of Hercules Robinson, 1st Baron Rosmead , and Sir Bryan Robinson, who was a judge like his grandfather, based in Newfoundland.

Character 

His seniority on the Bench made him a public figure of some importance, but he was never popular. He had strong and sometimes controversial political opinions: in particular he opposed full independence for the Parliament of Ireland, which was a cause dear to the hearts of Henry Grattan and his Irish Patriot Party. It may be relevant that through the long reign of George II of England, he was the only future Irish judge who never sat in the Irish House of Commons. On account of his political opinions, he was savagely attacked by pamphleteers, notably by Robert Johnson, a future High Court judge, who eventually destroyed his own career by anonymous attacks on his judicial colleagues and other officials. Robinson himself was accused of writing vicious and scurrilous anonymous pamphlets, but Elrington Ball judges this to be unlikely. These attacks seriously damaged his reputation, and as late as the 1860s a biography of "The Sham Squire" repeated many unflattering stories about Robinson, which appear to have originated in his lifetime. His manner was acerbic (one pamphlet refers to his "sarcastic sneer"), and he was notoriously morose. On the other hand, Ball argues that his charges to Dublin grand juries show him to have been both intelligent and humane. As a judge, he was noted for strict adherence to the letter of the law. On a more human note, he was noted for his fear of thunderstorms, a fear which he said was best alleviated by good claret.

Library 
He amassed a large collection of legal textbooks; after his death his son, Christopher, having no use for them, put them up for sale. The Benchers of the King's Inns bought most of the collection, and this formed the basis of the King's Inns Library.

References

Ball, F. Elrington The Judges in Ireland 1221-1921 London John Murray 1926
Kenny, Colum Kings Inns and the Kingdom of Ireland Dublin Irish Academic Press 1992
Lodge, John Peerage of Ireland Vol. 6 Dublin 1789
Woods, C.J. "Robinson, Christopher" Cambridge Dictionary of Irish Biography

Alumni of Trinity College Dublin
Members of Lincoln's Inn
Lawyers from Dublin (city)
1712 births
1787 deaths
Justices of the Irish King's Bench